The following article presents a summary of the 1954 football (soccer) season in Brazil, which was the 53rd season of competitive football in the country.

Torneio Rio-São Paulo

Final Standings

Corinthians declared as the Torneio Rio-São Paulo champions.

State championship champions

Other competition champions

Brazil national team
The following table lists all the games played by the Brazil national football team in official competitions and friendly matches during 1954.

References

 Brazilian competitions at RSSSF
 1954 Brazil national team matches at RSSSF

 
Seasons in Brazilian football
Brazil